Grimston is a village and civil parish in the English county of Norfolk, approximately 6 miles north-east of King's Lynn.
For the purposes of local government, it falls within the district of King's Lynn and West Norfolk.

The village is a few miles away from the Royal family residence at Sandringham House.

The village was built on a spring line and a Roman villa was found near Watery Lane in the late 19th century.  Subsequently, Roman villas were found in the neighbouring villages of Gayton Thorpe and Well Hall to the south and Congham and Appleton to the north.  Some red bricks from the villas were re-used in the church, on buttresses and on the South Wall.

Grimston, and particularly the nearby hamlet of Pott Row were quite significant centres of pottery production from the 11th to 16th centuries, and important suppliers of this to Scandinavia.  Grimstonware finds have also been made in Italy and Spain. Pots often had faces carved just under the rim.  Some of these can be seen in local museums including the Castle Museum, Norwich.

The Grade I listed Church of St Botolph has late Saxon or early Norman origins, largely extended in the 14th and 15th centuries.

Schools that serve the area of Grimston are Holly Meadows School (Primary) in Vong Lane and Springwood High School in King's Lynn (Secondary).

Adam Thoroughgood (1604 -1640) was born in Grimston.  He was a prominent Virginia settler in the 1620s, naming the city of Norfolk, Virginia after his home county. The district of Thoroughgood in Virginia Beach is named after him, and a house he built there is open as Adam Thoroughgood House.

Name
Grimston is a mixture of Anglo-Saxon and Old Norse words. Other place names with this formulation are called Grimston Hybrids. Grim is an alternative name for Odin, as well as being a commonly used personal name, and ton is from the Anglo-Saxon word for town or village.

Governance
An electoral ward of the same name exists. The population of this ward taken at the 2011 Census was 2,237.

Notes

External links

Villages in Norfolk
Civil parishes in Norfolk
King's Lynn and West Norfolk